First Tech Federal Credit Union (or First Tech) is a federally chartered credit union headquartered in Hillsboro, Oregon. It is regulated under the authority of the National Credit Union Administration (NCUA). First Tech has over 650,000 members, and over 12 billion dollars in assets with 33 branches located mostly in high technology business centers of California, Colorado, Oregon, Washington and four other states.
It was the first financial institution to offer telephone interactive voice response access and online banking.

History 
The credit union was founded as Tektronix Federal Credit Union, formed by seven Tektronix employees on January 14, 1952. In 1961, the name was changed to Tektronix Employees Federal Credit Union to reflect the credit union's membership. From very early on, technical innovation was emphasized and reflected in First Tech's motto of "Think Forward". As early as 1976, the credit union began using computers for online data processing. By 1979, Tektronix Employees Federal Credit Union had begun the use of ATMs. In 1985, the credit union unveiled "Call 24", which allowed members to check balances and transfer funds by phone.

In 1986, the name was changed to First Technology Credit Union and the membership was opened to include employees in technology industries of the Pacific Northwest.  In 1992, Microsoft became involved. The 1995 launch of the company's website paved the way for the credit union to become the second financial institution in the world to perform secure internet transactions. In 1997, the name was shortened to First Tech Credit Union. First Tech began offering mobile banking in 2000, account aggregation in 2001, and biometric two-factor authentication in 2007. With over 156,000 members, and over 1.8 billion dollars in assets in 2007, First Tech was one of the largest state chartered credit unions in the Pacific Northwest.

In March 2010, the company announced it would merge with California-based Addison Avenue Federal Credit Union, which served the employees of Hewlett Packard Company, Agilent Technologies, CH2M Hill, and various other technology based companies, pending government and member approval. The deal was approved by the government and credit union members, and became effective on January 1, 2011, with the new entity named First Tech Federal Credit Union.

The company relocated to a new corporate office in Hillsboro, Oregon, in 2018. The building is LEED Gold certified and is made almost entirely of cross-laminated timber (CLT). At the time of construction it was one of the largest CLT buildings in the world.

Online banking conversion 
First Tech announced, in 2014, their decision to replace existing desktop and  mobile banking platform while also converting members to a new bill payments provider.

In October 2015, the Credit Union implemented initial changes to their online and ebilling system and began converting members.  The transition incrementally converts groups of members to the new platform over an extended period to ensure minimal disruption.  CEO Greg Mitchell addresses members' challenges in an email to the Credit Union's members on 3/8/2016.

Products
Besides standard banking services, First Tech also offers investment, insurance, and tax services to its members, including free bill payment service, an account aggregation service, and online access to check images. The union's designated ABA routing transit number is 321180379.

References

External links

Credit unions based in Oregon
Banks established in 1952